S. V. Krishnamoorthy Rao (15 November 1902 – 18 November 1968)  was an Indian politician serving in the Indian National Congress. He was a member of the Upper House of the Indian Parliament the Rajya Sabha from 1952 to 1962. He was also the Deputy Chairman of the Rajya Sabha. He was elected to the Lower House of Parliament the Lok Sabha from the Shimoga, Mysore State in 1962 and was the Deputy Speaker of the Lok Sabha from 1962 to 1967.

References

External links
Official biographical sketch in Parliament of India website

India MPs 1962–1967
Deputy Speakers of the Lok Sabha
1902 births
1968 deaths
Rajya Sabha members from Karnataka
Deputy Chairman of the Rajya Sabha
Lok Sabha members from Karnataka
Indian National Congress politicians from Karnataka
People from Shimoga district